Division 43, Somali National Army (Somali: Qeybta 43aad) is a division of the Somali National Army. Focused on the southern part of the country, it is headquartered in Kismayo and covers the state of Jubaland.

Formations and battles 
The division has two major subordinate formations, the 10th Brigade (Somali: Guutada 10aad), focused on the Gedo region and Middle Juba and headquartered in Garbahaarey, and the 11th Brigade, focused on Lower Juba and headquartered in Kismayo.

In 2018, the 11th Brigade led an offensive north to the village of Baar-Sanguuni, leading to the capture of the village and the deaths of 7 militants.

In November 2021, a joint offensive in the Gedo region by the 10th Brigade led to the capture of Barwaqo and Kabis from al-Shabaab.

In January 2022, Al-Shabaab militants attacked a base of the 11th Brigade in Baar-Sanguuni, which was repelled.

In March 2022, the 11th Brigade, alongside the Jubaland Darawiish conducted an operation against al-Shabaab near the village of Jamame, killing 10 militants and arresting 6 others.

The division is commanded by General Aaden Kaalmooy.

Corruption and political issues 
Following the establishment of the Interim Juba Administration and the election of Ahmed Madobe, the Jubaland government agreed to integrate up to 1,440 fighters of various militias and of the Darawiish into Division 43 and the SNA, along with another 1,440 new recruits and independent militias in 2015. However by January 2016, it was noticed that up to 500 troops had dropped out of the integration process. While there hadn't been any official SNA forces in the division until the inauguration in July 2015 in Kismayo, SNA paystubs had been reporting a consistent 3,034 personnel since 2013. This money had probably been going into the pockets of the few SNA personnel in administrative command of the division. 

Through 2020 and 2021, elements of the federal forces and Division 43 have been at heads with the local Darawiish forces, with a battle in Balad Hawo between 700 SNA troops against the Darawiish in May 2020, and fierce battles between Jubaland forces and SNA troops again in Balad Hawo in January 2021, leading to the capture of several hundred Jubaland soldiers. Somali minister of information Osman Dubbe launched allegations that the Kenyan government was arming these militias, which they denied.

References 

Military of Somalia
Divisions (military units)
Military units and formations established in 2015